Franz Hametner (born 15 November 1900, date of death unknown) was an Austrian wrestler. He competed in the men's Greco-Roman welterweight at the 1936 Summer Olympics.

References

External links
 

1900 births
Year of death missing
Austrian male sport wrestlers
Olympic wrestlers of Austria
Wrestlers at the 1936 Summer Olympics
Place of birth missing